Patrick Ssenjovu is a film and theatre actor.  He is additionally a film director and producer.

Early life and education
He was born in Kayunga, Uganda.

Career

Theatre work
At age fourteen Ssenjovu became the youngest member of Impact International, a dance and theatre troupe, performing throughout Europe and the United States, including Woza Albert!, a political-satire play.

He then moved to New York City, New York, where he became a member of the Great Jones Repertory Company and worked with such people as Meredith Monk, Ellen Stewart, Ping Chong and Seth Barish. Ssenjovu has performed at venues including La MaMa Experimental Theatre Club, Lincoln Center, the Ohio Theatre and the St. Anne's Warehouse, all four located in New York City; and the New Jersey Performing Arts Center, located in Newark, New Jersey.

In 2000, he appeared as himself in Secret History, a theatre piece written and directed by Chong, at the Ohio Theatre.

Film and video-game acting
Ssenjovu appeared as Ibrahim Moshoeshoe in Game 6 (2005), a sport, comedy-drama film directed by Michael Hoffman; and Sydney Pollack’s The Interpreter (2005), a mystery-thriller, drama film directed by Sydney Pollack.

Additionally, he voice acted "Other Characters" in X-Men Origins: Wolverine (2009), a science-fiction, fantasy-action video game.

Film producing and directing
Ssenjovu produced and directed Awaken'' (2009), a short, drama film.

Notes

External links

 Official website
 "Woza Albert!", a performance flyer at La MaMa Experimental Theatre Club's official website.  Accessed August 24, 2010.

Ugandan male film actors
Ugandan film directors
Ugandan film producers
Living people
Ugandan male stage actors
Ugandan emigrants to the United States
Ugandan male voice actors
Year of birth missing (living people)